Domingo Amestoy —born Dominique— (1822–1892) was a Basque sheepherder, and banker, one of the original founders to provide the financing for the Farmers and Merchants Bank in Los Angeles, California, in 1871.

Life
Born in the Basque village of Saint-Pierre-d'Irube, France, Domingo Amestoy came to California by way of Argentina in 1851. Amestoy started a modest sheep business and within a few years he parlayed it into a fortune. He was one of the largest wool producers in Southern California during the 1860s. In 1871, he bought $500,000 worth of shares in the newly established Farmers and Merchants Bank in Los Angeles. In 1874 he went back to France and married. By 1880, he had over 30,000 head of sheep, most of which were fine-wooled Spanish merinos.

In 1889 he acquired all  of Rancho Los Encinos in the San Fernando Valley. After Domingo Amestoy died on January 11, 1892,  his sons, John and Peter Amestoy, assumed ranch operations and changed the name to Amestoy ranch. Like other ranches in the San Fernando Valley at the time, the Amestoys cultivated wheat and barley. The Amestoy family held title to rancho for fifty-five years. In 1915, subdivision of the rancho began later developing into the communities of Sherman Oaks and Encino.

Legacy
Amestoy Elementary School in Gardena, California was named in his honor. Amestoy Avenue in the San Fernando Valley was named in his honor. Amestoy Avenue runs approximately  North-South through the neighborhoods of Encino, Reseda, Northridge, and Granada Hills from Ventura Boulevard (interrupted) to the 118 Freeway.

References

People from Labourd
American financial businesspeople
Businesspeople from Los Angeles
Land owners from California
Ranchers from California
1822 births
1892 deaths
Farmers and Merchants Bank of Los Angeles people
History of Los Angeles
History of the San Fernando Valley
American people of Basque descent
French-Basque people
French emigrants to the United States
People from Encino, Los Angeles
People from Gardena, California
19th century in Los Angeles